The France's 1995–1996 nuclear test series was a group of 6 nuclear tests conducted in 1995–1996. These tests followed the 1989–1991 French nuclear tests series .

References

French nuclear weapons testing
1995 in French Polynesia
1996 in French Polynesia